Roger of Helmarshausen (fl. 12th century) was a well-known goldsmith and metalwork artist, and also a Benedictine monk.

Artistic career
Roger is first heard of in connection with Stavelot Abbey in the Meuse valley, a centre of Mosan art, and especially goldsmith's work. He worked between 1100 and 1107 in St. Pantaleon's church in Cologne. At least two portable altars made by him are in the treasury of Paderborn Cathedral.

In 1107 he moved to Helmarshausen Abbey, where he established a goldsmith's workshop. In conjunction with the well-known scriptorium, where the Gospels of Henry the Lion were produced later in the 12th century, he created several important works in the Romanesque style, including various illuminated codices, as well as many pieces of jewellery.

De diversis artibus
Roger has been proposed by a number of academics (for example, Albert Ilg (1874) and C. R. Dodwell (1961)) as the real author of the important medieval treatise De diversis artibus (also Schedula diversarum artium), which is ascribed to the pseudonymous Theophilus Presbyter. This suggestion is not universally accepted, but has been supported by other academics, including Cyril Stanley Smith (1963 and 1974), Lynn White Jr. (1964) and Eckhard Freise (1981).

References

 Freise, E. "Roger von Helmarshausen in seiner monastischen Umwelt". In Frühmittelalterliche Studien, 15, 1981.

German Benedictines
German goldsmiths
11th-century births
12th-century deaths
Romanesque artists